The men's sailboard sailing event at the 2011 Pan American Games will be held from October 17–23 at the Vallarta Yacht Club in Puerto Vallarta. The defending Pan American Games champion is Ricardo Santos of Brazil.

Points were assigned based on the finishing position in each race (1 for first, 2 for second, etc.). The points were totaled from the top 9 results of the first 10 races, with lower totals being better. If a sailor was disqualified or did not complete the race, 11 points were assigned for that race (as there were 10 sailors in this competition). The top 5 sailors at that point competed in the final race, with placings counting double for final score. The sailor with the lowest total score won.

Schedule
All times are Central Standard Time (UTC-6).

Results 

Race M is the medal race in which only the top 5 competitors took part. Each boat can drop its lowest result provided that all ten races are completed.  If less than ten races are completed all races will count.  Boats cannot drop their result in the medal race.

References

External links
Sailing schedule

Men's sailboard
Puerto Vallarta
RS:X competitions